Louis Perry Anderson (March 24, 1953 – January 21, 2022) was an American stand-up comedian, actor, author and game show host. Anderson created the cartoon series Life with Louie and the television sitcom The Louie Show, and wrote four books, including Hey Mom: Stories for My Mother, But You Can Read Them Too, which was published in 2018. He was the fourth host of the game show Family Feud, from 1999 to 2002, in its third run and second revival.

For his performance on the FX comedy television series Baskets, Anderson received three consecutive Primetime Emmy Award for Outstanding Supporting Actor in a Comedy Series nominations and won once in 2016.

Anderson performed a stand-up show called Louie: Larger Than Life in Las Vegas, Nevada, from 2003 through 2012. The show originated at the Union Plaza hotel downtown, before moving to Excalibur, South Point, and Palace Station hotels.

Early life 
Anderson was born and raised in Saint Paul, Minnesota, the son of Ora Zella (née Prouty; 1912–1990), a Mayflower descendant, and Louis William Anderson (1901–1980). His father was a trumpeter for singer Hoagy Carmichael. Anderson was the second youngest of 11 children in his family. In a 2016 interview on WTF with Marc Maron, Anderson revealed that his mother actually gave birth to 16 children, but five of them—the first baby and then two sets of twins—died at birth.  Anderson described his father as "abusive" and an alcoholic.

Anderson attended Johnson Senior High in Saint Paul.

Career 

Anderson made his television debut on January 13, 1984, on Rodney Dangerfield's Young Comedians Special on HBO.

1980s 
On November 20, 1984, Anderson made his network debut as a comedian on The Tonight Show. In late 1985, Anderson was cast as Lou Appleton alongside Bronson Pinchot on the pilot episode of Perfect Strangers for ABC (which was known in this early stage as The Greenhorn). When the show was picked up, Anderson was replaced by Mark Linn-Baker in the role of Appleton (whose first name was then changed from Lou to Larry) as the producers didn't think the chemistry between Anderson and Pinchot was quite right. The show ran for eight seasons on ABC. Anderson had a small role in the singing-telegram scene in Ferris Bueller's Day Off, as well as appearing in a comedy special on Showtime.

Anderson also played a role in John Landis' film Coming to America, which starred Eddie Murphy and Arsenio Hall, a role which he reprised in the 2021 sequel. Murphy requested Anderson be hired for Coming To America after producers wanted a white actor in the otherwise African-American cast; Murphy described his friend Anderson as "the funniest white guy around". Anderson also starred in the 1988 camp comedy The Wrong Guys, based on a story by John Hughes.

In 1989, Anderson guest-starred on the first episode of The Muppets television segment of The Jim Henson Hour.

1990s 
In 1995, Anderson created and produced a Saturday-morning animated series for Fox called Life with Louie. The series was based on Anderson's childhood with 10 siblings, a sweet-hearted mother and a loud, war-crazed father. It also detailed how he was picked on for his weight, and how he used comedy to deal with the teasing. The show was a 3-year hit on Fox, and won two Daytime Emmy Awards for Outstanding Performer in an Animated Program.

Anderson created and starred in The Louie Show for CBS. The show had Anderson playing a psychotherapist in Duluth, Minnesota. The show ran six episodes and was cancelled.

Anderson landed the role of host of the new version of Family Feud in 1999. Anderson asked former Feud host Richard Dawson to appear on the premiere show to give him his blessing, but Dawson declined. Anderson organized a 9/11-themed tournament week of Family Feud between the FDNY and the NYPD, putting up $75,000 toward both organizations for recovery from the September 11, 2001, attacks. Anderson was let go from the show in 2002 and was replaced by Richard Karn.

2000s 
In 2000, Anderson appeared as a panelist on an episode of To Tell the Truth hosted by John O'Hurley, and in 2001, Anderson appeared on an episode of Weakest Link, winning $31,000. He made appearances on network television in Scrubs, Grace Under Fire, Touched by an Angel (Then Sings My Soul, November 28, 1999), and Chicago Hope. He guest starred on the Adult Swim cameo-filled show Tom Goes to the Mayor.

Anderson played in the 2006 World Series of Poker Main Event in Las Vegas, Nevada.

2010s 
Anderson filmed a standup special entitled Louie Anderson: Big Baby Boomer. In it, Anderson poked fun at his bad habits, pesky family members, and aging body.

In 2013, Anderson appeared in the ABC reality television series Splash. After practicing several dives into a swimming pool then nearly drowning, he needed help getting out from co-star football player Ndamukong Suh. Anderson signed on as the promotional spokesperson for his home state's Land O'Lakes Sweet Cream butter brand. Anderson appeared in radio jingles, web ads, and television commercials promoting the product.

From 2016 to 2019, Anderson played the part of Christine Baskets on the FX comedy series Baskets. Anderson won the 2016 Primetime Emmy Award for Outstanding Supporting Actor in a Comedy Series for his performance.

On July 23, 2017, Anderson competed on an episode of Celebrity Family Feud (hosted today by Steve Harvey); his opponent was singer/actress Christina Milian. This made him one of only a small number of individuals to have both hosted and been a contestant on the same game show, and also marked his first appearance on any form of Family Feud since his departure as host in 2002. Anderson was a regular panelist on the TV game show Funny You Should Ask from September 2017 until the show went on hiatus in 2020.

Stand-up style 
Dennis Miller called him "one of the lightest on his feet comedians I know ... There's very few guys I'm going to leave my dressing room early (to watch). ... (Louie has) a Fred Astaire, with a broken leg, approach. Very quick thinking, and he wouldn't hammer points home, but he would do a 'weave-back' that was almost Pulp Fiction-like."

Personal life 
In 1984, Anderson married Diane Jean Vono; however, they divorced after four months. In 1985, Anderson married his high school sweetheart, Norma J. Walker. The marriage lasted only four weeks.

Blackmailing incident 
In 1997, Anderson was blackmailed by Richard John Gordon, who threatened to tell tabloids that Anderson sexually propositioned him in a casino in 1993.

Between 1997 and 1998, Anderson paid Gordon $100,000 in hush money, fearing that the story would threaten his starring roles in two family-oriented series, but when Gordon's demands increased to $250,000 in 2000, Anderson's lawyer informed federal authorities. Gordon, who was 31 at the time, was arrested after leading FBI agents on a high-speed chase along Santa Monica Boulevard. Gordon was fined and sentenced to 21 months in prison.

Health and death 
In 2003, Anderson underwent two successful heart procedures. 

On January 18, 2022, it was announced that Anderson had been hospitalized in Las Vegas for large B-cell lymphoma; he had first been diagnosed with cancer a decade earlier, but kept the information private. Anderson died of complications from the cancer three days later, on January 21, at the age of 68.

Filmography

Film

Television

Video games

Books 
Anderson authored the following:

 Dear Dad: Letters from an Adult Child, a collection of letters to his late father (1989) 
 Goodbye Jumbo... Hello Cruel World, a self-help book for those who struggle with self-esteem issues (1994) 
 The F Word: How to Survive Your Family, 49 family survival tips (2002) 
 Hey Mom: Stories for My Mother, But You Can Read Them Too  (2018)

References

External links 
 Official website
 
 

1953 births
2022 deaths
20th-century American comedians
20th-century American male actors
21st-century American comedians
21st-century American male actors
American game show hosts
American male television actors
American male voice actors
American stand-up comedians
Comedians from Minnesota
Daytime Emmy Award winners
Deaths from cancer in Nevada
Deaths from non-Hodgkin lymphoma
Las Vegas shows
Male actors from Saint Paul, Minnesota
Outstanding Performance by a Supporting Actor in a Comedy Series Primetime Emmy Award winners
Participants in American reality television series
Writers from Saint Paul, Minnesota